Arrhoges is a monospecific genus of medium-sized sea snails, marine gastropod mollusks in the family Aporrhaidae and the superfamily Stromboidea.

Species 
This genus contains the following species:
 Arrhoges occidentalis (Beck, 1836)

References

External links
 Underwater observers network : photos 

Aporrhaidae